Makiusap Ka sa Diyos  is a 1991 Filipino film starting Ruffa Gutierrez, Christopher de Leon and Gabby Concepcion.  It was director Lino Brocka's final movie prior to his death in a car crash.

Plot 
A nun named Dolores (Gutierrez) is raped. She becomes pregnant, gives birth and is punished by her cruel superiors. She then meets Vince (de Leon) and marries him but later discovers that Vince was the one who raped her.

Cast 
 Ruffa Gutierrez as Dolores Aaron-Leveriza
 Christopher de Leon as Dr. Vince Leveriza
 Gabby Concepcion as Allan
 Gloria Romero as Encarnacion Leveriza
 Rosemarie Gil as Mrs. Aaron
 Maricel Laxa as Belinda
 Cris Villanueva as Emil
 Mary Walter as Sister Bernadette
 Anita Linda as Sister Carmen
 Gamaliel Viray as Lawyer
 Rudy Tacorda as Judge
 Malu de Guzman as Sister Amanda
 Aida Carmona as Kumadrona
 Ernie Zarate as Fr. Emman
 Benjie Ledesma as Sister Daisy
 Vanjie Labalan as Baliw
 Estrella Kuenzler as Sister Asuncion
 Chie Concepcion as Ursula
 Jayboy Samson as Benjie
 Mad Nicolas as Sister
 Yvonne Angeli Lee as Cecile
 Thea Salvador as Sister
 Michael Tan as Lester
 Pocholo Montes as Priest Confessor
 Nonong Talbo as Ward Orderly

Awards

See also
 Sa Kabila ng Lahat

References

External links 
 

1990s Tagalog-language films
1991 films
Philippine religious epic films
Films directed by Lino Brocka